Methacton High School (MHS) is a public high school located in the Fairview Village area, in Worcester Township, Montgomery County, Pennsylvania, in the Philadelphia metropolitan area. A part of the Methacton School District, it serves students in grades 9-12 from Worcester and Lower Providence townships (including the census-designated places of Audubon, Eagleville and Trooper). The school's mascot is a Native American warrior, and its colors are green and white. The school has approximately 1,757 students and 183 faculty. The current principal is Dr. Jamie Gravinese.

History
The first thing accomplished as the two districts merged was the opening of the Lower Providence-Worcester Joint Junior-Senior High School in 1961. The school was later named Methacton, and graduated its first class in 1964. The origin of the school's name is believed to be an American Indian term for "windy hill."

Vincent Farina, the man for whom the administration building is named, served as the first principal of the joint junior-senior high school.  After serving as the second Supervising Principal of the Lower Providence-Worcester Joint School System in 1962-63, he was later named the superintendent of the Methacton School District, a capacity he continued in until his retirement in 1977.

Academics 
Individualized schedules are provided to all students that reflect a strong core curriculum with the flexibility to explore various academic and personal interests. Extensive technology applications include state of the art computer labs, Internet access throughout the building and a full range of computer based curricular offerings. The library houses over 32,000 volumes as well as access to various electronic media. A complete telecommunications studio provides daily student broadcasts integrated with courses designed to prepare students for the twenty-first century. The Counseling staff offers a full range of services to students and parents from college and career planning to individual counseling needs.

Methacton High School was ranked #14 out of 689 public high schools in Pennsylvania by SAT score in 2012.

Advanced Placement 
The high school currently offers 24 AP courses: 
 AP Art History
 AP Biology
 AP Calculus (AB & BC)
 AP Capstone Seminar and Research
 AP Chemistry
 AP Computer Science A
 AP Computer Science Principles
 AP English Language
 AP English Literature
 AP Environmental Science
 AP European History
 AP Human Geography
 AP Music Theory
 AP Physics C: Mechanics
 AP Psychology
 AP Spanish Language & Culture
 AP Statistics
 AP Studio Art (2-D, 3-D, & Drawing)
 AP U.S. Government
 AP U.S. History
The high school recently released that it would be adding AP Capstone, one of approximately 1,000 schools worldwide to implement AP Capstone, in addition to AP Computer Science Principles, for the 2017-2018 school year.

Extracurriculars
In addition to the clubs and activities found in most high schools, Methacton High School has multiple extracurricular organizations. 
Academic Decathlon — Team competition in which contenders match their intellects with students from other schools. There are 10 categories of challenge.
Economics Club - Teaches students the principles of microeconomics and macroeconomics. Competes in the National Economic Challenge. 
History Bowl — Participates in the National History Bowl and Bee Competition. Has qualified for the national competition the past 2 yrs. 
Investment Club — Promotes the study of economics and participates in the Stock Market Game.
Key Club — Promotes community service as a branch of the Kiwanis Club. Activities include the annual March for Babies.
Mock Trial — Participates in the PBA/YLD Mock Trial Competition. 
Model United Nations — Methaction is one of two public schools in the Delaware Valley that has a Model UN team and competes at DELMUN, the other being from the Upper Perkiomen School District.
Music Appreciation Club — Meets weekly to discuss new and old music as well as hosting the annual battle of the bands.
National Honor Society — Nation's premier organization established to recognize outstanding high school students. More than just an honor roll, NHS serves to honor those students who have demonstrated excellence in the areas of Scholarship, Leadership, Service, and Character.
Robotics Club — Founded in 2011-2012 school year to promote the studies of the physical sciences and engineering.
Science Fair — Participates in both the Pennsylvania Junior Academy of Sciences (PJAS) Competition and the Montgomery County Science Research Competition (MCSTA). Winners from MCSTA move on to the Delaware Valley Science Fair, where several students have been able to advance to the Intel International Science and Engineering Competition (ISEF). 
TEAMS — Participates in the Tests of Engineering Aptitude, Mathematics, and Science (TEAMS) annual competition. Has consistently ranked among the best in the state and advanced to the national competition.  
Theatre Company's mission is to present to the community the best plays by the world's greatest playwrights while maintaining a strong educational theatre program that fosters an ensemble spirit and offers students opportunities to learn.
Warrior News Team — Produces news programs, including morning announcements.
Warrior's Performance Group — Raises awareness about human rights, diversity through visual and performing arts.

Athletics 
Methacton is a Pennsylvania Interscholastic Athletic Association (PIAA) District 1 member. Boys sports include: Baseball, Basketball, Cross Country, Football, Golf, Indoor and Outdoor Track and Field, Lacrosse, Soccer, Swimming and Diving, Tennis, and Wrestling. Girls sports include: Basketball, Cross Country, Field Hockey, Golf, Indoor and Outdoor Track and Field, Lacrosse, Soccer, Softball, Swimming and Diving, and Volleyball.

Enrollment for sports in 2013 totaled 1,271 students.

Notable alumni

 Courtney Friel, Fox news reporter
 Elin Hilderbrand, romance novelist
 Jennifer L. Holm, Newbery Honor-winning author
 Ryann Krais, gold and bronze medalist the 2007 World Youth Championships in Athletics (track and field)
 Morgan Turner, actress, plays Martha in Jumanji: Welcome to the Jungle
 Eric Wareheim, co-creator, writer, and star of Tim and Eric Awesome Show, Great Job! and Tom Goes to the Mayor
 Robbie Wine, professional baseball player for the Houston Astros (1987–1988) and the head coach at Penn State University (2004-2013)

References

External links
 
 Methacton's athletic website

Educational institutions established in 1961
Public high schools in Pennsylvania
Schools in Montgomery County, Pennsylvania
1961 establishments in Pennsylvania